2,3-Xylidine is the organic compound with the formula C6H3(CH3)2NH2. it is one of several isomeric xylidines.  It is a colorless viscous liquid.  The compound is used in the production of the drug mefenamic acid and the herbicide xylachlor.

References

Anilines